Prostanthera baxteri is a species of flowering plant in the family Lamiaceae and is endemic to the south-east of Western Australia. It is an erect shrub with narrow egg-shaped to linear leaves and white flowers with a tinge of blue to pale mauve.

Description
Flowering occurs from August to November.

Taxonomy
Prostanthera baxteri was first formally described in 1834 by George Bentham in his book Labiatarum genera et species, from an unpublished description by Allan Cunningham. The type specimens were collected near King George Sound.

Distribution and habitat
This mintbush grows on granite outcrops, rocky places and sandplains in mallee and heath communities in the Esperance Plains and Mallee biogeographic regions in the south of Western Australia.

Conservation status
Prostanthera baxteri is classified as "not threatened" by the Western Australian Government Department of Parks and Wildlife.

References

baxteri
Flora of Western Australia
Lamiales of Australia
Taxa named by Allan Cunningham (botanist)
Plants described in 1834